My Town may refer to:

 Mytown (organization) (Multicultural Youth Tour of What's Now), a youth organization in Boston, Massachusetts, U.S.

In music:
 My Town (album), an album by Montgomery Gentry
 "My Town" (Montgomery Gentry song), the title track
 Mytown, an Irish boy band, a predecessor of the pop rock band The Script
 Mytown (album), their self-titled album
 "My Town", a song by Buck-O-Nine from Twenty-Eight Teeth
 "My Town" (Glass Tiger song), a song by Glass Tiger from Simple Mission
 "My Town" (Hollywood Undead song), a song from American Tragedy